Candace A. Bond (born June 27, 1965) is an American businesswoman who is the president and CEO of AESA Inc., a business advisory and community development consulting firm. She has served as United States ambassador to Trinidad and Tobago since December 2022.

Early life and education 
Bond was born in St. Louis in 1965. Her mother, Anita Lyons Bond, is a civil rights activist. After graduating from the Villa Duchesne and Oak Hill School, she earned a Bachelor of Arts degree in government from Harvard College and a Master of Business Administration from Harvard Business School.

Career 
From 1992 to 1997, Bond was a vice president at Motown Records. In 2019, she was featured in The Black Godfather, a Netflix documentary about the record label. From 1997 to 2001, she was the vice president of De Passe Entertainment for special projects. From 2001 to 2003, she was the vice president of Essence and general manager for entertainment. In 2004 and 2005, she was a senior partner at Impact Strategies. From 2005 to 2010, she was a managing partner at Infusion Media Partners. She was also a business development advisor at EV Structure. Since 2010, she has been a principal at Beacon Rose Partners, a real estate investment firm. She is the president and CEO of AESA, a consulting firm that offers advisory services in community development, environmental stability, governance, education, and health equity.

United States ambassador to Trinidad and Tobago
On March 18, 2022, President Joe Biden nominated Bond to be the next ambassador to Trinidad and Tobago. Hearings on her nomination were held before the Senate Foreign Relations Committee on July 28, 2022. The committee favorably reported her nomination to the Senate floor on August 3, 2022. She was confirmed by the Senate on September 29, 2022. On November 15, 2022, she was ceremonially sworn in by Vice President Kamala Harris as ambassador, and she presented her credentials to President of Trinidad and Tobago Paula-Mae Weekes on December 8, 2022.

Personal life 
Bond and her husband, Steven McKeever, have two children and live in Los Angeles. McKeever works as an attorney. Bond's oldest son, Brent McKeever, is a photographer.

References 

1965 births
Living people
Ambassadors of the United States to Trinidad and Tobago
Businesspeople from California
Businesspeople from Los Angeles
Harvard Business School alumni
Harvard College alumni
People from St. Louis
American women diplomats